Iguatemi is a district in the subprefecture of São Mateus in the city of São Paulo, Brazil.

The area where the district is located, until the end of the 1960s, was composed of sites and farms and was known as Guabirobeira and Mall. The first lots were Villa Eugenie, Jardim São Gonçalo, Garden Roseli Marilú & Garden (opened in 1965) followed by others in the 1970s.

The district's population is estimated at 115,000 inhabitants and is predominantly mestizo. It is a neighborhood made up of citizens originating in northeastern Brazil, from Spain, from Japan, mostly industrial workers in the region of Mooca, Ipiranga and ABC. There are also some descendants of Japanese and Lebanese who excel in the trade.

The district will be serviced in the near future by a monorail system.

References

Districts of São Paulo